When Women Keep Silent (German: Wenn Frauen schweigen) is a 1937 German comedy film directed by Fritz Kirchhoff and starring Johannes Heesters, Hansi Knoteck and Friedrich Kramer. A newly married couple become involved in a series of marital differences, largely due to misunderstandings.

Cast

References

Bibliography 
 Bock, Hans-Michael & Bergfelder, Tim. The Concise CineGraph. Encyclopedia of German Cinema. Berghahn Books, 2009.

External links 
 

1937 films
1937 comedy films
German comedy films
Films of Nazi Germany
1930s German-language films
Films directed by Fritz Kirchhoff
UFA GmbH films
German black-and-white films
1930s German films